Beus is a surname. Notable people with the name include:

 Stephen Beus (born 1981), American pianist
 Alf Beus (born 1954), Australian rules footballer
 Det de Beus (1958–2013), Dutch field hockey player

See also
 Bess (name)